Benjamín Bonasso (born 1 June 1997) is a United States rugby union player, currently playing for the Rugby United New York of Major League Rugby (MLR) and the United States national team. His preferred position is flanker.

Professional career
Bonasso was born in Connecticut before moving to Buenos Aires as a child, playing age grade rugby in Argentina. He signed for Major League Rugby side Rugby United New York for the 2021 Major League Rugby season. 

Bonasso debuted for United States against Uruguay during the 2023 Rugby World Cup – Americas qualification.

References

External links
itsrugby.co.uk Profile

1997 births
Living people
United States international rugby union players
Rugby New York players
Rugby union flankers
People from Connecticut
American rugby union players
Argentine rugby union players